George Onakkoor (born 16 November 1941, Travancore) is an Indian novelist who writes in Malayalam language. He was a Malayalam professor for over three decades at Mar Ivanios College, Trivandrum, Kerala.

Onakkoor is a novelist, short-storywriter, critic, script and travel writer. He was the former Director of Kerala State Institute of Children's Literature, State Institute of Encyclopaedic Publications and Kerala State Literacy Council. He also served as the first Non-official Chairman of the State Resource Centre.

The awards he received include The Jawaharlal Nehru Award for his service as Chief Editor of the Children's Encyclopaedia; the award for the best research thesis submitted in Indian Universities in the field of Art and Literature, the Kesava Dev Centenary Memorial Award, Thakazhi Sahithya Award, C. Achutha Menon Award, Mother Teresa Award, KCBC Award, Kerala Shree Award, Kesava Dev Award etc. He is also the recipient of the prestigious SBT 'Suvarna Mudra'. He has been honoured by the Government of Kerala for his contributions to Language and Literature. The Award for the outstanding Indian writer given by the Euro-American Expatriate Literary Association was yet another laurels he received. The Kerala Sahithya Academy Award has been conferred on Dr. George Onakkoor twice for his novel (Illam in 1980) and travelogue (Adarunna Akaasham in 2005).

His writings include Akale Akasham, Uzhavuchalukal, Ulkkadal, Illam, Kalthamara, Kamana, Ezhuthapurangal, Samathalangalkkappuram, Hridayathiloru Vaal, Parvathangalile Kaattu, Pranaya Thazhavarayile Devadaru, Yordan Ozhukunnathu Evidekku (Novels), Orchid, Kamana, The Sword in the Soul, The Wind in the Mountains, The Sea Within (Translations of his five novels), and Ivar Enikku Arayirunnu? (Memoirs).

Personal details 
 Father:Late Naduviledathu Kuriakose
 Mother: Late Mariamma
 Spouse: Valsa George
 Children: Darsana George, Adarsh Rio George, Anaswara Chintu George
 Grandchildren: Avinash Sudheer, Amrit Geo Adarsh, Alok Geo Amith, Allene Mary Amith, Ankit Tom Adarsh, Adit Geo Amith

Education 
B.A. in Economics, University of Kerala, 1962 (Nirmala College, Muvattupuzha)

M.A. in Malayalam Language & Literature, University of Kerala, 1964 (St.Berchman's College, Chenganachery)

M.Phil. in Malayalam, University of Kerala, 1978 (Kerala University Centre)

Ph.D. from University of Kerala, 1983

Subject: 'The Concept of Hero in Malayalam Novel'

Student career 
Chairman, Literary Association, Nirmala College, Muvattupuzha: 1961 & 1962
Magazine Editor, St. Berchmans College, Changanacherry: 1963
Arts Club Secretary, St. Berchmans College, Changanacherry: 1964
First Prize, Inter-Collegiate Debating Competition 
for Godavarma Trophy: 1963
First Prize, Inter-Collegiate Debating Competitions 
for Sree Narayana Trophy: 1963 & 1964

Publications, Literary 
Literary Critic and Novelist. Author of fifty-two books.
 Akale Akasam (Novel)- 1972
 Oolkadal (Novel)- 1975
 The Sea Within (English translation) - 2013
 Kalthamara (Novel) - 1977
 Orchid (English translation) - 1978
 Ezhuthappurangal (Novel) - 1978
 Illam (Novel)	- 1979
 Kamana (Novel) - 1981
 Kamana (English edition) - 1981
 Uzhavuchalukal (Novel) - 1985
 Nalu Poochakkuttikal (Stories) - 1985
 Njan Kathirikkunnu (Novel) - 1986
 Njan Oru Kaioppu Matram (Stories)	- 1988
 Rachanayude Rahasyam (Children’s Literature) - 1989
 Thapovanathile Sooryan (Children’s Literature) - 1989
 The Sun of the Hermitage (English Translation) - 2003
 Olivumarangalude Nattil (Travelogue) - 1989
 Marubhumiyude Hridayam Thedi (Travelogue)	- 1990
 Maria Goretti (Children’s Literature)	- 1991
 Mahatma Gandhi (Biography) - 1994
 M. P. Paul, Kalapathinte Thiruseshippukal (Biography)	- 1994
 Nadu Neengunna Neram (Stories) - 1995
 Samathalangalkkappuram (Novel) - 1996
 Arshajnanathinte Pravachakan (Biography) - 1999
 The Prophet of Ascetic Wisdom (English Translation) - 2003
 Puthiya Sahasrabdham : Samasyakal (Study)	- 2002
 Adarunna Akasam (Travelogue) - 2003
 Samaya Soochikal Nischalam (Stories) - 2005
 Hrudayathil Oru Wal (Novel) - 2005
 The Sword in the Soul (English Translation) - 2007
 Rachanayude Nervazhi (Children’s Literature) - 2006
 Kuttikalude Sampoorna Bible (Children’s Literature) - 2007
 Parvathangalile Kaattu (Novel) - 2007
 The Wind in the Mountains (English Translation) - 2008
 Ente Sanchara Kathakal (Stories) - 2009
 Pranaya Kathakal (Stories) - 2009
 Manalkkattinte Sabdam (Biography)	- 2010
 Ivar Enikku Aaraayirunnu (Memories) - 2010
 Kathakal - Onakkoor (Collection of Stories) - 2010
 Pranaya Thazhvarayile Devadaru (Novel) - 2012
 Yordan Ozhukunnathu Evidekku (Novel) - 2013
 Akasathinte – Adarukal (Travelogue) - 2014
 Akasa Oonjal (Novel) - 2016
 Pranayathinte Kanal Vazhikal (Stories) - 2018
 Hrudayaragangal (Autobiography) - 2018
 Bhoomiyude Spandanam (Novel) - 2020

Publications, Academic 

 Kerala Bhasha Ganga (Literary Criticism) - 1963
 Yuga Prathibha (Literary Criticism) - 1963
 Sahitya Sameepanam (Literary Criticism) - 1968
 Ithihasa Pushpangal (Literary Criticism) - 1969
 Nayakasankalpam Malayala Novelil (Thesis)	- 1986
 Kalathinte Thiricharivukal (Essays)- 2011

Cinema
•Contributed, story, screenplay and dialogue for nine feature films in Malayalam:

 Aradhana
 Ente Neelakasam
 Leyam
 Katha Parayum Kayal
 Johny
 Kaithappoo
 Oolkatal
 Kilikonchal
 Yamanam

• Contributed script for twelve documentary films.

• The film Oolkatal won a number of awards in 1979.

• The film Yamanam won the Indira Gandhi Award for the best thematic content.

Radio and television 
 Has given a number of talks through All India Radio.
 Participated as an actor in the radio plays broadcast from All India Radio, Thiruvananthapuram.
 Conducted a literary quiz and cultural discussions on Doordarshan, Asianet, Surya TV, Kairali TV, Jeevan TV, Amrita TV, and Jaihind TV.
 Contributed script for the Doordarshan TV serials Illam and Kalthamara

Awards
 The novel ‘Illam’ won the Kerala Sahitya Academy Award in 1980 for the Best Novel written during the period from 1977 to 1979.
 The novel ‘Kamana’ won the Mar Ivanios Cultural Award in 1984.
 The Ph.D. thesis ‘Nayakasankalpam Malayala Novelil’ won the first K.M. George Sapthathi Award for the best thesis produced in Indian Universities on Language, Literature and Culture during the period from 1980 to 1985.
 The Film Critics Award for the Best Story Writer in 1991, for the film ‘Yamanam’ based on the novel ‘Kamana’. The film ‘Yamanam’ won the National Award for the Best Social Theme in 1992.
 Honoured with Jawaharlal Nehru Award, instituted by the Mathrubhumi Study Circle, for the outstanding contributions to Children's Literature in 1993.
 ‘Akale Akasam’ and ‘Illam’ were prescribed as textbooks for the Degree Course of the University of Kerala.
 ‘Orchid’—the translation of the novel ‘Kalthamara’—was prescribed as a textbook in the Clerk Atlanta University, Georgia, U.S.A.
 ‘M. P. Paul: Kalapathinte Thiruseshippukal’ won the Sahodaran Ayyappan Award for the best Biography in 1996.
 The biography ‘Arshajnanathinte Pravachakan’ won the Delhi Malankara Association Bi-Decennial Literary Award in 1999.
 Darsana Award for the outstanding contribution to the field of culture in 2000.
 Milan Award (Michigan Malayalee Literary Association of North America Award) for the unique contribution to Art, Literature and Culture in 2002
 Kesava Dev Birth Centenary Award for the total contribution to the Malayalam Novel in 2003
 The travelogue “Adarunna Akasam” won the Kerala Sahitya Academy Award in 2005
 First Euro-American Pravasi Award for the outstanding Indian Writer in 2005
 ‘STATE HONOUR’ by the Govt. of Kerala for the Distinguished Contribution to  Language & Literature (2005)
 The Novel ‘Hrudayathil Oru Wal’ won the K.C.B.C. Award, the prestigious Thakazhi Award  and Kerala Sree Award (2006)
 ‘Sukrutham’ Award for literature (2008)
 The Novel ‘Parvathangalile Kaattu’ won the Mother Teresa Award (2008) and P. Kesava Dev Award (2009)
 C. Achutha Menon Award for the total contribution to culture (2010)
 Gandhi Darshan Award for Literature (2011)
 SBT ‘Suvarna Mudra’ for the total contribution to language, literature & culture.
 Honoured by the Indian Media Forum (IMF), Dubai on the 50th Year of Creative Writing
 Honoured by Thiruvananthapuram Public Library on the 50th Year of Creative Writing in 2013
 Honoured by Dubai Art and Literary Association in 2013
 Goodness Excellence Award for the total contribution to Literature in 2014
 ‘Champaran Thozhilali Prakshobha Smaraka’ Puraskaram (2016)
 ‘Akshayasree’ Award for literature (2017) 
 ‘G. Gopinathan Nair Smruthi Puraskaram for literature (2017)
 Ettumanoor Somadasan Award for literature (2017)
 Kerala Sahrudaya Vedi Award (2019)
 Kaduvayil Thangal Charitable Trust Award (2019)
 Kendra Sahitya Academy Award for Hrudayaragangal (Autobiography) in 2021

Editing and Publishing Experience 
 Editor-in-Chief and Director of the Publications of the State Institute of Children’s Literature including the ‘Bala Kairali Vijnanakosam’ (Children’s illustrated multicolour Encyclopaedia in 7 vols.) and ‘Akshara Kairali’ series.
 Editor-in-Chief and Director of ‘Sarva Vijnana Kosam’ (General Encyclopaedia in 20 vols.) & ‘Viswa Sahitya Vijnanakosam’ (Encyclopaedia of World Literature in 10 vols.)
 Editor-in-Chief of Fifty Supplementary Readers for Neo-Literates.
 Edited the book ‘Ayyappa Panicker: Vyakthiyum Kaviyum’. 
 Edited the book ‘The Speeches of C. H. Mohammed Koya in the Kerala Legislative Assembly’.
 Edited the book ‘The Speeches of Joseph Mundasseri in the Kerala Legislative Assembly’.
 Sub-Editor of ‘Deepika’ Malayalam Daily for two months
 Honorary Editor of 'Grandhalokam,'
 Organ of the Kerala Grandhasala Sanghom for three years
 Member of the Editorial Board of the 'Sahityalokam'
 Organ of the Kerala Sahitya Academy for eight years
 Chief Editor of the 'S.I.C.L. News' for four years
 Chief Editor, NBS Bulletin for five years
 Hon. Editor, Kilippattu Magazine

Administrative Experience
 Chairman, State Resource Centre, Kerala: 3 years
 Director, The State Institute of Encyclopaedic Publications: 2 years
 Director, The Kerala Saksharatha Samithi: 2 years
 Director, The State Institute of Children's Literature: 5 years
 Head of the Department of Malayalam, Mar Ivanios College, Thiruvananthapuram: 29 years
 Member, Director Board & Executive Committee of SPCS (Sahithya Pravarthaka Co-operative Society), Kottayam: 3 years
 Member, Managing Committee, Kerala Sahitya Academy: 2 years
 Member, Managing Committee, 'Thonnackal Asan Smarakam':3 years
 Chairman, SPCS Publication Committee: 5 years
 President, Kerala Film Critics Association

Positions in Academic, Cultural Bodies
 Member of the Kerala Sahitya Academy General Council and Finance Committee from 1974 to 1977 and from 1981 to 1984 and member of the Managing Committee from 1984 to 1986
 Member of the Kerala University Senate from 1984 to 1988 (Government nominee representing the authors)
 Member of the Board of Studies in Malayalam, Gandhiji University, Kottayam from 1984 to 1987
 Member of the Board of Studies in Malayalam, University of Kerala from 1984 to 1990
 Member of the Advisory Board of the Correspondence Course, University of Kerala from 1977 to 1981
 Member of the Advisory Board, Department of Publications, University of Kerala from 1985 to 1988
 Member of the Director Board and Executive Committee of the Sahithya Pravarthaka Co-operative Society from 1980 to 1983
 Member of the Advisory Panel of the Regional Film Censor Board from 1984 to 1989 and from 2008 to 2012
 Member of the 'Thonnackal Asan Smarakam' from 1985 to 1988
 Member of the School Syllabus Reforms Committee in 1983
 Member of the School Library Committee from 1983 to 1988
 Member of the Thiruvananthapuram Public Library Committee from 1982 to 1986 and 2011 onwards
 Member of the Media Committee, Kerala Saksharatha Samithi from 1991 to 1993
 Former Member of Kerala State Pre-primary Education Advisory Board
 Former Member of the Language Committee, Bharatiya Jnanapith Award
 Former Chairman of the Publication Committee, Sahithya Pravarthaka Co-operative Society
 Former Member of the Senate – CUSAT (Cochin University of Science & Technology) from 2007 onwards (nominated by the Chancellor of the University - Governor - State of Kerala, representing the authors)
 Former Member of the Raja Ram Mohun Roy Library Foundation of India
 Member of the Judging Committee for State Award, Professional Dramas
 Chairman of the State Award Committee for the Best Book on Cinema
 Member of the National Executive of Encyclopaedia Makers
 Member of the Language Advisory Committee of the Encyclopaedic Publications, Govt. of Kerala
 Member of the Selection Committee for Sponsored Programmes, Doordarshan
 Member of the Script Selection Committee of the National Film Development Corporation
 Member of the Swadeshabhimani Memorial Trust
 Member of the Ayappa Paniker Foundation
 Member of the Programme Advisory Committee, Prasar Bharathi
 Member of the Educational Core Commission, Govt. of Kerala
 Member of the Official Language Commission, Govt. of Kerala
 Member, Advisory Board of the Thunchathu Ezhuthachan Malayalam University
 Expert member of the State School Curriculum
 President of the C.V. Raman Pillai National Foundation
 President of the P. Kesavadev Foundation
 President of 'Margi', Centre of Classical Art Forms
 President, Mahakavi Mulur Foundation
 President, Kerala Film Critics Association
 Patron, Institution of Librarians and Information Scientists

Teaching experience
 Total 33 years of teaching at college level

Research Experience 
 Research Guide, University of Kerala from 1984 onwards. Ph.D Produced: 15

Other activities 
 Represented the Kerala University in the All India University Teachers Conference on National Integration held at Madurai in 1971.
 Presided over the All India Seminar on Children's Literature held at Bangalore in 1989.
 Presented papers at the All India Seminar on Children's Literature held at Thiruvananthapuram in 1984; New Delhi in 1989 and in 1990; Hyderabad in 1990 and Ahmedabad in 1991.
 Presented papers in Ulloor, Asan and Ezhuthachan Seminars organized by the Department of Malayalam, University of Kerala.
 Convenor of the All India University Teachers and Students Seminar held at Thiruvananthapuram in 1971.
 Convenor of the All India University Youth Festival held at Thiruvananthapuram in 1972.
 Director of the Literary workshops organized by the Kerala University Union four times.
 Director of the Literary Camp organized by the Kerala Sahitya Academy, at Thiruvananthapuram in 1981.
 Member of Cultural Delegation of the Kerala Sahitya Academy, visited the State of Gujarat in 1977.
 Member of the Committee to adjudge the First, Third and Fourth Prem Nazir Award; First Swadeshabhimani Award; Abudhabi Malayalee Samajam Award; Sahitya Academy Award, etc.
 Participated as Guest of Honour in the Fourth International Literary Convention organized by the Literary Association, North America at Toronto, Canada in 2002.
 Participated as Guest of Honour in the First Euro-American International Literary Conference held at Cologne, Germany in 2005.
 Participated as Guest of Honour in the Annual meeting of 'Sruthi', New Castle, U.K. in 2009.

Ulkkadal

In this novel, Rahulan, the protagonist, is a romantic and poet. The novel unveils as he reaches the city from his village and joins college for his PG. The loner Rahulan becomes friends with Davis and Jayasahankar. As the friendship grows, Rahulan also gets close with Reena, Davis's sister. Romance unfolds and it was only natural that Reena, the budding painter and Rahulan the poet were attracted to each other. 
But both brother – who had also found love in Susanna – and sister are wary about the profound presence of an orthodox father, James who will never approve his children finding soulmates outside their religion. Remember the Novel is set in 1970s Kerala where religion and caste boundaries were sacrosanct.

The sudden twist in the story comes as fate becomes villain and Davis dies in a Motorbike accident leaving his sweetheart, Susanna astray.  Rahulan gets a job as college lecturer and his heart still longs for Reena. James who could not bear the death of his only son turns a heart patient and Rahulan is forced to leave behind his unfulfilled love. Later Rahulan is nursing his broken heart and living a life in despair.

Enter Meera, the student who falls in love with her lecturer. She uses her cunningness and outspoken nature to get him close and in very less time their romance becomes the talk of the town.

But Rahulan meets Susanna again, but this time as Prof Paul's daughter-in-law. Rahulan learns of Susanna's brother's wedding plans with none other than Reena.

Rahulan gets engaged to Meera. There is little he could do as he lets himself to be a puppet in fate's hands. As he reaches home form his engagement he is surprised to see Reena who has come to him leaving behind her home. Rahulan is caught between his love for Reena and engagement to Meera. The Novel reaches climax as Meera's father encounters Rahulan and Reena together, leaves the scene calling off the engagement.
Rahulan wastes no time and welcomes Reena into his life.

The novel was adapted into a movie with the same name and won accolades as the first ever movie in India fully based out of college campus. Ulkadal was the trend setter for a series of campus movies, a genre successfully explored by many film makers later in Indian cinema.

References

External links 
 https://www.facebook.com/george.onakkoor
 https://www.youtube.com/watch?v=LOP9X3A9tAk
 https://www.youtube.com/watch?v=egvz8DKiFkM
 https://www.youtube.com/watch?v=YZRHaBy_YZU&list=PL499328DA87D0DD47
 https://www.youtube.com/watch?v=heSFyIpTMC8
 https://www.youtube.com/watch?v=n3UDxWJAD3w

1941 births
Living people
Malayalam novelists
Malayalam-language writers
Syro-Malankara Catholics
Indian Eastern Catholics
Writers from Thiruvananthapuram
20th-century Indian novelists
20th-century Indian short story writers
Novelists from Kerala
Recipients of the Sahitya Akademi Award in Malayalam